Gyraulus acronicus is a small species of freshwater snail, an aquatic pulmonate gastropod mollusk in the family Planorbidae, the ram's horn snails.

Distribution
The distribution of this species is Holarctic.

It is known to occur in islands and countries including:
 Czech Republic
 Slovakia
 Germany - critically endangered (vom Aussterben bedroht) 
 Poland - endangered
 Great Britain

Description
The  shell is nearly planispiral in its coiling.

Habitat
This small snail lives on water plants in freshwater.

References

acronicus
Gastropods described in 1807